There are, twenty Norwegian ice hockey players have been selected in the National Hockey League (NHL) Entry Draft. The majority of the players on this list, were playing for either a Norwegian or a Swedish ice hockey club when they got drafted.

No player have ever been selected in the first round of the NHL Entry Draft. The highest draft selection was Marius Holtet, who was drafted in the second round, as the 42nd overall in the 2002 NHL Entry Draft. The 2011 draft marked the first time a Norwegian goalie was selected, when Steffen Søberg was picked in the third round by the Washington Capitals. Later in the same draft, the Boston Bruins chose fellow goaltender Lars Volden from the Finnish team Espoo Blues. The most notable Norwegian draftee is 2002 NHL All-Star player Espen "Shampo" Knutsen, who played 207 regular season games in the NHL for the Mighty Ducks of Anaheim and most notably for Columbus Blue Jackets.

Drafted players

Footnotes

References

 
 
 
 
 

Norwegian
 NHL Entry Draft